The Plymouth Naval Memorial is a war memorial in Plymouth, Devon, England which is dedicated to British and Commonwealth sailors who were lost in World War I and World War II with no known grave.

History
After World War I, the Royal Navy wanted to find a way to commemorate sailors and Royal Marines who had died at sea and had no known grave.  An Admiralty committee recommended building memorials at the three main naval ports in Great Britain – Plymouth, Chatham,  and Portsmouth. The memorials at all three sites were designed by Sir Robert Lorimer with sculpture by Henry Poole.

Following World War II, the naval memorials were expanded to commemorate the dead from that war.  Sir Edward Maufe performed the architectural design for the expansion at Plymouth, and the sculpture was by Charles Wheeler and William McMillan.

The Plymouth memorial also bears the names of sailors from Australia, South Africa, and India. The Plymouth Naval Memorial commemorates 7,251 sailors of the World War I and 15,933 of the World War II.

Other memorials in Halifax and Victoria in Canada, Auckland, New Zealand, Mumbai, India, Chittagong, Bangladesh, and Hong Kong commemorate sailors who came from those parts of the Commonwealth.  The Newfoundland Memorial at Beaumont Hamel in France bears the names of 229 Newfoundland sailors lost at sea during World War I.

The memorial is maintained by the Commonwealth War Graves Commission. It became a Grade II listed building in 1975, upgraded to Grade II* in 1998, and was further upgraded to Grade I in May 2016 for the centenary of the Battle of Jutland.

Location
The memorial is situated centrally on The Hoe which looks directly towards Plymouth Sound.

Design
The memorial features a central obelisk, with names of the dead arranged according to the year of death. Those for the First World War are on panels affixed to the obelisk's base; those for the Second World War are on panels set into the surrounding wall. Within each year, the names are grouped by service, then by rank and surname.

Notable people commemorated at the memorial

First World War
 Lieutenant Cecil Abercrombie and Lieutenant-Commander John Skinner Wilson, Scottish rugby internationals
Sergeant John Costello of the Royal Marines, English footballer

Second World War
 Master-at-Arms W. G. E. Luddington, Royal Navy rugby representative player
 Admiral Sir Tom Phillips
 Able Seaman Walter Sidebottom, English footballer

See also

 Chatham Naval Memorial
 Portsmouth Naval Memorial
 Grade I listed war memorials in England

References

External links
News: 'No Grave but the Sea' Memorial - BBC Rewind footage (from the BBC Archives) of Princess Margaret unveiling the extension to the memorial in 1954 (includes audio)

Buildings and structures in Plymouth, Devon
Commonwealth War Graves Commission memorials
Naval monuments and memorials
British military memorials and cemeteries
World War I memorials in England
World War II memorials in England
Monuments and memorials in Devon
Grade I listed buildings in Devon